Jesse Turner may refer to:

Jesse Lee Turner, American singer
Jesse H Turner Park
Jesse Turner, student kidnapped by Islamic Jihad for the Liberation of Palestine
Jesse Turner, 2008 Grammy nominee

See also
Jessie Franklin Turner, designer